Slit may refer to:

 Slit (protein), in genetics, the midline repellent signaling molecule 
 Slitting, a shearing operation that cuts a large roll of material into narrower rolls
 Slit trench, a defensive fighting position in warfare
 Slit Woods, a Site of Special Scientific Interest in County Durham, England
 Sublingual immunotherapy or SLIT, immunotherapy that involves putting allergen extracts under the tongue
 Arrowslit or loophole, a defensive slot in the wall of a building that allows archers to fire at invaders if the building is threatened
 Slang for the pudendal cleft of the vulva

See also
 
 
 Caso Degollados (English: slit-throat case), a Chilean politically motivated series of murders

 Slat (disambiguation)
 Slot (disambiguation)
 Slut (disambiguation)
 Silt (disambiguation)